Fikret Yılmaz (born 1 August 1957) is a Turkish football manager, and retired footballer best known for his stints as a goalkeeper with Antalyaspor in the Süper Lig, and as the father of the Turkish international footballer Burak Yılmaz.

Professional career
Fikret was a goalkeeper in various teams in the top divisions of Turkey from the 1980s to the mid 90s. Fikret made his professional debut in a 3-1 Süper Lig loss to Fenerbahçe S.K on 2 June 1985. Fikret scored his only career goal for Kemerspor in a TFF Third League 2-1 loss to Antalya Köy Hizmetlerispor on 12 August 1991.

Personal life
Fikrat is the father of the Turkish international footballer Burak Yılmaz.

References

External links
 
  (as coach)
 
 Mackolik Coaching Profile

1957 births
Living people
People from Adana
Turkish footballers
Turkish football managers
Antalyaspor footballers
MKE Ankaragücü managers
Kayseri Erciyesspor managers
Orduspor managers
Süper Lig players
Süper Lig managers
TFF First League players
Association football goalkeepers